The Northland skink (Oligosoma northlandi) is an extinct species of skink which was endemic to the Northland Region of North Island, New Zealand. It is known from late Holocene subfossil remains.

References

Oligosoma
Extinct reptiles of New Zealand
Reptiles described in 1991
Taxa named by Trevor H. Worthy